Osmia aglaia, the Oregon berry bee, is a species of bee of the family Megachilidae and genus Osmia. O. aglaia is a pollinator of brambles, including raspberries and blackberries, in western Oregon and California. They are metallic blue, green or rust/bronze in color.  They nest in tunnels in wood about 3/8 - 1/4 inches in diameter. They are active as adults in late spring, while Rubus is in bloom.

References

aglaia
Insects described in 1939